Yale University women's ice hockey (YWIH) is an NCAA Division I varsity ice hockey program at Yale University in New Haven, Connecticut.

One of the oldest varsity women's ice hockey programs in the country, Yale women's ice hockey dates back to 1975. Beginning as a club sport, the program gained varsity team status in 1977–78.

Yale competes in the ECAC Hockey League (ECACHL), along with Ivy League foes Harvard, Princeton, Cornell, Dartmouth and Brown. Both the Yale men's and women's ice-hockey teams play at Ingalls Rink, also known as "The Whale".

Coaches
The current head coach is Mark Bolding, who took over the helm in April 2019. He is the 11th head coach for Yale.  In his first season with the team, the Bulldogs set a program record with 17 wins, including 13 conference wins, also a school record, beating the previous record set in 2004-2005.  The season included a six-game winning streak, the longest in program history. Bolding came to the Bulldogs after serving as the head coach for the Norwich University women's ice hockey team.

Joakim Flygh coached the Bulldogs from 2010 until 2019. In 2014-2015, the team tied the school's record for conference wins with 12, and finished with the second highest number of goals scored (93). Prior to taking on head coaching responsibilities at Yale, Flygh was an assistant coach at Harvard and University of Minnesota-Duluth. Flygh resigned as head coach in February 2019. 

Hilary Witt was the head coach from 2002 to 2010. Witt was named ECAC Women's Coach of the Year in 2002–03, and became Yale's all-time leader in wins in 2005. The 2004–05 squad set the school record for overall wins (16) and conference wins (12), earning a trip to the ECAC semifinals for the first time. The 2007–08 team broke the school record for goals in a season with 96 and finished with the second-most wins in school history, 15.

History
Yale University created its women's ice hockey program in the fall of 1974, under coach John Ormiston, a former Yale varsity captain working in the development office, who volunteered to coach an enthusiastic group of mostly novice players. During its first year, the program had few games, mostly against high school teams. Its first recorded match was on December 9, 1975 versus Choate-Rosemary Hall. The Bulldogs prevailed by a 5–3 tally. Two years later, the Bulldogs hockey program would attain varsity status.
 
Laurie Belliveau played for Yale from 1994 to 1998. In four years, she participated in 98 games. Statistically, she logged 5,809 minutes, recorded 4,262 saves, and registered a .911 save percentage while posting a 4.32 goals against average. She has averaged more than 43 saves per game. In 1994–95, Belliveau became the first freshman in any sport to earn Ivy League Player of the Year honors. During the season, she made an ECAC record 78 saves in a game. The opponent was the Providence Friars women's ice hockey program.

In 1998, Laurie Belliveau was one of two Ivy League players named first team All-Americans. This was the first time that Ivy League women's hockey players were bestowed such an honor. 

Hillary Witt was hired as head coach for the 2002-2003 season, after working as the assistant coach for one season.  The Bulldogs had a stand-out year in 2004-2005, with a program high 16 wins overall and 12 conference wins. The following year, they set the all-time record for goals scored. Witt left at the end of the 2009-2010 season.

On April 3, 2011, Yale player Mandi Schwartz succumbed to recurrent acute myeloid leukemia at age 23. She was a forward on Yale's women's hockey team and had a string of 73 consecutive games played. In her honor, the Yale Bulldogs introduced the Mandi Schwartz Award in April 2011. The annual award is given in acknowledgement of a Yale Bulldog player's courage, grit and determination. Aleca Hughes was named as the first winner. On what would have been her 24th birthday, the ECAC renamed its Student-Athlete of the Year Award in honor of Schwartz.

YWIH participates in Bulldog PAWS, a program at Yale New Haven Hospital that teams children with brain tumors with one of the Yale Athletic Teams. In 2011, they adopted a nine-year-old girl, Giana, with a brain tumor; she went to all of their home games. Alyssa Zupon was instrumental in developing the partnership.

The Bulldogs broke the previous program record of wins and conference wins in the 2019-2020 season. They finished 17-15-0 over all, and 13-9-0 in conference play. They played perennial rival Harvard in the quarterfinals of the ECAC tournament. After an opening game loss, they won the second game in overtime. In the tie-breaker, they lost in triple overtime by a score of 3-2. 

In July 2020, the Ivy League announced that league play would be suspended in Fall 2020 due to the 20202 coronavirus pandemic.

Year by year

Current roster
As of September 21, 2022.

Team Scoring Champions

International
Hilary Witt was a member of the U.S. Women's National Team in 2001
Hilary Witt also earned a pair of silver medals as an assistant coach for the U.S. at the 2006 Four Nations Cup and the 2007 IIHF World Championships.
 Helen Resor played at the 2006 Four Nations Cup and the 2005, 2007 and 2008 IIHF World Championships.
Helen Resor, Crysti Howser and Sheila Zingler were at the 2007 USA Hockey Women's National Festival, meaning that the 2006–07 Yale team tied for the most representatives at the camp among all ECAC schools.

Olympians
Helen Resor was selected to play for Team USA in the 2006 Olympics. Resor was the first Bulldog to achieve that status, and when she won a bronze medal she became the first Yale hockey player of either gender to earn a medal since five Bulldog men won silver with Team USA in 1932.
Denise Soesilo was the second Yale women's hockey player to compete in the Olympics. She played for Team Germany.
Phoebe Stanz played for Switzerland's national team, winning a bronze medal in the 2014 Winter Olympics in Sochi.

Awards and honors
Laura Anderson, 2020 New England Hockey Writers Association Joe Tomasello Award (Unsung Hero)
Laurie Belliveau, three-time Ivy League Player of the Year
 Laurie Belliveau, Goaltender, 1996 All-ECAC Team
Laurie Belliveau, Nellie Pratt Elliott Award
Laurie Belliveau, Finalist for the Patty Kazmaier Award, 1998
Lucy Burton, ECAC Hockey Mandi Schwartz Student-Athlete of the Year
Jenna Ciotti, Hockey East Player of the Week (Week of February 8, 2011)
Jenna Ciotti, Hockey East Rookie of the Week (Week of February 8, 2011)
Alyssa Clarke, Honorable Mention All-Ivy League, 2007–08, Defenseman, Yale (Sophomore)
 Erika Hockinson, Yale's Thomas W. Ford '42 Community Outreach Award
 Aleca Hughes, 2012 Sarah Devens Award
 Crysti Howser, Honorable Mention All-Ivy League, 2007–08, Forward, Yale (Junior)
 Kelsey Johnson, finalist for the inaugural ECAC Student-Athlete of the Year Award (2007)
 Bray Ketchum, nominee for the 2010 Patty Kazmaier Memorial Award  
 Helen Resor, Defense, 2009 Third Team All-ECAC 
 Helen Resor, finalist for the 2009 Patty Kazmaier Award 
 Kristin Savard, Hockey Humanitarian Award (2007)
 Kristin Savard, Yale's Thomas W. Ford '42 Community Outreach Award
Jackee Snikeris, Honorable Mention All-Ivy League, 2007–08, Goaltender, (Freshman) 
 Jackee Snikeris, nominee for the 2010 Patty Kazmaier Memorial Award
Jackee Snikeris, MLX Skates Goaltender of the Week (Week of November 30, 2010)
Jackee Snikeris, 2010–11 ECAC Goaltender of the Year
Jackee Snikeris, 2010–11 ECAC Women's Student-Athlete of the Year
Jackee Snikeris, 2011 Sarah Devens Award
Rebecca Vanstone ECAC All Rookie Team

ECAC All-Academic
Jaimie Leonoff, 2011–12 to 2014–15
Mandi Schwartz, 2006–07 to 2008–09
Jackee Snikeris, 2007–08 to 2010–11

Hockey Humanitarian award finalists
Julianna Schantz-Dunn, 2000
Deanna McDevitt 2003
Kristin Savard 2007 (who won the award)
Crysti Howser 2009
Aleca Hughes, 2011 and 2012 (winner)

Ivy League honors
 Alyssa Clarke, Defense, Senior, 2010 Honorable Mention
 Bray Ketchum, Forward, Junior, 2010 Second Team All-Ivy
 Jackee Snikeris, Goaltender, Junior, 2010 First Team All-Ivy
 Mallory Souliotis, 2015-16 Second Team All-Ivy League
 Mallory Souliotis, 2017-18 First Team All-Ivy
 Greta Skarzynski, 2017-18 Second Team All-Ivy
 Gianna Meloni, 2017-18 Honorable Mention All-Ivy
 Emma Seitz, 2018-19 Second Team All-Ivy League
 Rebecca Vanstone, Forward, First year, 2020 Second Team All-Ivy
 Emma Seitz, Defense, First Year, 2020 Second Team All-Ivy 
 Claire Dalton, 2019-20 Honorable Mention All-Ivy

New England hockey writers All-Star Team
2003–04 G Sarah Love
2004–05 D Erin Duggan
2006–07 D Helen Resor
2010–11 G Jackee Snikeris

USCHO honors
Erin Duggan, 2004–05 All USCHO.com First Team
Helen Resor, 2004–05 All USCHO.com Rookie Team

Bulldogs in professional hockey

See also
List of college women's ice hockey coaches with 250 wins
Yale Bulldogs men's ice hockey

References

External links

 
Ice hockey teams in Connecticut